Manuela Marxer-Lippuner (born 5 August 1965) is a retired athlete from Liechtenstein who competed in the heptathlon. She represented her country at four consecutive Summer Olympics, starting in 1984, as well as three World Championships. Her best results came, however, at the European Championships where she finished thirteenth and twelfth in 1990 and 1994 respectively.

Between 1990 and 1994 she was chosen as Liechtenstein sportswoman of the year four consecutive times. She still holds national record in a number of events.

International competitions

Personal bests

Outdoor
100 metres – 11.84 (Luxembourg 1995) NR
200 metres – 24.40 (+0.8 m/s, Helsinki 1994)
800 metres – 2:12.93 (Helsinki 1994)
100 metres hurdles – 13.38 (Jona 1994) NR
High jump – 1.76 (Split 1990)
Long jump – 6.13 (+0.9 m/s, Helsinki 1994) NR
Shot put – 13.53 (Götzis 1996) NR
Javelin throw (old model) – 41.08 (Barcelona 1992)
Heptathlon – 6045 (Helsinki 1994) NR

Indoor
60 metres – 7.79 (Magglingen 1991) NR
60 metres hurdles – 8.41 (Mannheim 1994) NR
High jump – 1.69 (Magglingen 1994) NR
Long jump – 5.90 (Mannheim 1994) NR
Shot put – 13.36 (Magglingen 1994) NR

References

All-Athletics profile

1965 births
Living people
Liechtenstein female athletes
World Athletics Championships athletes for Liechtenstein
Athletes (track and field) at the 1984 Summer Olympics
Athletes (track and field) at the 1988 Summer Olympics
Athletes (track and field) at the 1992 Summer Olympics
Athletes (track and field) at the 1996 Summer Olympics
Olympic athletes of Liechtenstein
Heptathletes